Central New Brunswick Academy is a middle and secondary school located in New Bandon, New Brunswick, Canada. The school opened in September 2010.

Central educates around 300 students in grades 6–12. The principal is currently Barbara Long.

Educational organization
The school is managed by the Anglophone West School District.
The two feeder schools are Doaktown Consolidated School and Upper Miramichi Elementary School.

History

Upper Miramichi Regional High School and Doaktown Consolidated High School Closure
These schools were closed and students were transferred to this school.

See also
List of schools in New Brunswick

References

External links
 

Schools in Gloucester County, New Brunswick
High schools in New Brunswick
Educational institutions established in 2010
2010 establishments in New Brunswick